Lady Bu (died November 238), personal name Bu Lianshi, was a concubine of Sun Quan, the founding emperor of the state of Eastern Wu in the Three Kingdoms period of China. She has posthumously been honoured as an empress by Sun Quan. She is also known as Empress Bu.

Life
Lady Bu was from Huaiyin County, Linhuai Commandery, which is in present-day Huai'an, Jiangsu. She was born sometime in the late Eastern Han dynasty. She was a relative of Bu Zhi. When she was young, her mother brought her from Huaiyin to Lujiang Commandery (around present-day Anqing, Anhui). In 199, Lujiang was conquered by the warlord Sun Ce, who controlled the territories in the Jiangdong region (also called Wu, covering present-day southeastern China), after which Lady Bu moved from Lujiang to Jiangdong. In Jiangdong, Lady Bu was noticed by Sun Ce's younger brother, Sun Quan, for her beauty and she became Sun Quan's concubine. Sun Quan favoured her the most among all his wives. She bore Sun Quan two daughters: Sun Luban and Sun Luyu.

Lady Bu was known to be very accepting towards Sun Quan's other wives and she did not show any signs of jealousy towards them. As such, she remained in her husband's favour in the long term. In May 229, when Sun Quan declared himself emperor and established the state of Eastern Wu, he wanted to install Lady Bu as the empress even though his subjects nominated Lady Xu to be the empress instead. Sun Quan rejected his subjects' suggestion and left the position of empress unfilled. Despite so, in the following ten years or so, the imperial family and everyone in the palace referred to Lady Bu as the Empress. Lady Bu died in 238 and was posthumously honoured as an empress by Sun Quan on 24 November of that year. She was interred in the Jiang Mausoleum (at the Purple Mountain, Nanjing, Jiangsu).

Lady Bu's personal name was not recorded in her biography in the Records of the Three Kingdoms (Sanguozhi), the authoritative source for the history of the Three Kingdoms period. However, the Jiankang Shilu mentioned that her personal name was "Lianshi", hence she was also known as "Bu Lianshi".

In popular culture

Lady Bu is first introduced as a playable character in the seventh installment of Koei's Dynasty Warriors video game series. She is referred to as "Lian Shi" in the game.

See also
 Eastern Wu family trees#Sun Quan
 Lists of people of the Three Kingdoms

Notes

References

 Chen, Shou (3rd century). Records of the Three Kingdoms (Sanguozhi).
 Xu, Song ( 8th century). Jiankang Shilu.

People of Eastern Wu
Year of birth unknown
238 deaths
Chinese imperial consorts
People from Huai'an
Family of Sun Quan
Eastern Wu posthumous empresses